The Namibian Annual Music Awards (NAMA) ceremony was the biggest awards ceremony in Namibia. It was established in 2011 by MTC Namibia and the Namibian Broadcasting Corporation (NBC). They would award a NAMA trophy to musicians in recognition of their outstanding achievements in the  music industry of Namibia. Along with the trophy, musicians receive sponsorships, endorsement deals and cash prizes.

The NAMAs were usually held in the capital Windhoek. It was broadcast live on DStv on an NBC channel. The show had international music judges, hosts and artists. The first NAMAs took place in May 2011 and the overall winners were Jericho (Best Male Artist) and Gal Level (Best Female Artist). The NAMAs came to a finale on 31 October 2020.

Categories 
Below is the full list of categories available at the Namibian Annual Music Awards.

 Best Afrikaans
 Best Ma/gaisa
 Best Oviritje
 Best Shambo
 Best Soukous/Kwasa
 Afro Pop (incl. Township Disco)
 Best Collaboration
 Best Gospel
 Best Kwaito
 Best R&B
 Best Rap/Hip-Hop
 Best Rock/Alternative
 Best House
 Best Reggae
 Best Kizomba
 Best Instrumental (incl. Jazz)
 Best Acapella
 Most Disciplined Artist
 Best Group or Duo
 Best Newcomer of the Year
 Best Single/Non Album
 Best International Achievement

Winners

2011
 Best Afrikaans: Lownan - "Wambo Seun"
 Best Ma/gaisa: !Oubasen - "Ander donkie"
 Best Oviritje: Pouua Concert Group - "Ekuva"
 Best Shambo: Tunakie - Naghelo
 Best Soukous/Kwasa: Ndilimani Cultural Troupe - "Ndilimani"
 Best Afro Pop (incl. Township Disco): Uno Boy - "Take It Easy"
 Best Collaboration: Stefan Ludik - "Black girl White Boy"
 Best Gospel: D-Naff - "Jesus Oteya"
 Best Kwaito: Gazza - "Penduka"
 Best R&B: Berthold - "Friends with Benefits"
 Best Rap/Hip-Hop: Jericho - "He Ta Pa Te"
 Best Rock/Alternative: Stefan Ludik - "Kick it Up A Gear"
 Best House: Award withdrawn from Lady May for controversial behaviour
 Best Reggae: MN Johnson - "I Fear No Evil"
 Best Kizomba: Atushe - "Meme"
 Best Instrumental (incl. Jazz): Flamingo - "Oudjenda"
 Best Acapella: Mighty Vocals - "Amen"
 Best Traditional: Erna Chimu - "Telewaniba"
 Best Group or Duo: Gal Level - "Ohole"
 Best Newcomer of the Year: Berthold
 Best Single/Non Album: Ru "Million Dollar Chick"
 Best Music Video: Gazza - "Shukusha"
 Best Song of the Year: The Dogg - "Jabule"
 Best Male Artist: Jericho
 Best Female Artist: Gal Level
 Best Album: Gal Level (Next Level)
 Best Producer: Araffat
 Best International Achievement: Ees (Eric Sell)
 Most Disciplined Artist: Uno Boy
 Lifetime Achievement Award: The late Jackson Kaujeua

2012
 Best Afrikaans: Philip - "Alles Op Die Altaar"
 Best Ma/gaisa: Dixson - '/Namsaros"
 Best Oviritje: Ongoro Nomundu - "Ndjipo Ngoma Man!!"
 Best Shambo: Tyna - "Nand Otushekwa"
 Best Collaboration: Ees featuring Mandoza "Ayoba"
 Best Gospel: Caroline - "Libita"
 Best Kwaito: The Dogg - "Tromentos"
 Best R&B: Linda - "I Believe"
 Best Rap/Hip Hop: Catty Cat - "Letter From My Heart"
 Best Soukous/Kwasa: Waka - "Mondabo"
 Best Rock/Alternative: Famaz Attack - "First Song"
 Best House: TeQuila - "Party Tonight"
 Best Reggae: Gerry Dread - "Tjava Nawa"
 Best Kizomba: Atushe - "Amor"
 Best Instrumental/Jazz: TeQuila - "Kaveshishi"
 Best Acapella: Mighty Vocals - "Ena Ramuhona"
 Best Group/Duo: Paradox - "Baby"
 Best Newcomer: Linda - "I Believe"
 Best Single: Linda - "I Believe"
 Best Single/Non Album: Cyberspace - "That's Why"
 Best Traditional: Master Green - "!Gameb Kans"
 Best Music Video: Ees - "Ayoba"
 Most Disciplined Artist: Dixon
 Best Male Artist of the Year: Mushe
 Best Female Artist of the Year: TeQuila

2013 
Album of the Year: Damara Dikding - Beats From the Heart
Song of the Year (public vote): Mushe - "Onkalamwenyo"
Radio Song of the Year: Mushe
Best Female Artist of the Year: Blossom
Best Male Artist of the Year: Mushe - "Letter From the President"
Lifetime Achievement Award: Papa Fransua
Best International Achievement Award: The Dogg
Best Producer: Damara Dikding
Most Disciplined Artist of the Year: Exit
Best Acapella: Ama-Khoe - "Neda"
Best Afrikaans: S-Man - "Holliday"
Best Afro Pop (inclusive of Township Disco): Mushe - "Letter From the President"
Best Collaboration: Gazza - "Gazatt"
Best Ma/gaisa: Damara Dikding - "Papa Se Ne"
Best Gospel: D-Naff - 'What a Mighty God We Serve'
Best Group or Duo: Tswazis - "Step by Step"
Best House: Gazza - "Gazatt"
Best Instrumental (inclusive of Jazz): Big Ben - "Social Avenue"
Best Kizomba: Blossom - "Ondjila Yetu"
Best Kwaito: Mushe - Mush - "Push"
Best Music Video: Gazza - "Gimme Gimme"
Best Newcomer of the Year: Blossom - "Komuthima Gwomeya" 
Best Non-Album Single: Sandra Blak - "Music"
Best Oviritje: The Wire - "Eruru"
Best R&B: Floritha - "I Owe It All to You"
Best Rap/Hip Hop: Ru CuteGeek - "Sanity"
Best Reggae: Bantusan Faridread @ Omidi D'Afrique  - "Lovely Day"
Best Rock/Alternative: Famaz Attak - "Live Fast Die Young"
Best Shambo: Blossom - "Tilia ft. Tunakie"
Best Single: Mushe - "Onkalamwenyo"
Best Soukous/Kwasa: Sally - "Boss Maddam"
Best Traditional: Kamati - "Omapenda"

See also 

Jericho
Channel O Music Video Awards
Kora Awards
Music of Namibia

References 

Namibian awards
Namibian music
2011 establishments in Namibia
African music awards